Dilip Singh Parihar (born 17 December 1957) is an Indian politician. He is a member of the Madhya Pradesh Legislative Assembly for Neemuch constituency, elected in 2013. He also was MLA from 2003–2008. He is a member of the Bharatiya Janata Party.

References

External links
 

1957 births
Bharatiya Janata Party politicians from Madhya Pradesh
Living people
Madhya Pradesh MLAs 2003–2008
Madhya Pradesh MLAs 2013–2018
People from Neemuch